Andriy Anatoliyovych Demchenko (born 20 August 1976) is a Ukrainian and Russian football coach and former player who manages Dila Gori. He played as an attacking midfielder or forward.

Club career
Playing football Demchenko started out in his native Zaporizhia where his first coach (trainer) was Borys Zozulya and Viktor Vysochyn. When Demchenko turned 13, his new trainer was Anatoliy Vasyleha who coached him before Demchenko moved to Moscow. During his teenage years Demchenko was spotted by Gennadiy Kostylev, a Soviet Union national team coach, and Demchenko participated in some international tournaments among junior teams. During dissolution of the Soviet Union, in 1990 Demchenko was invited as a prospect player to play for PFC CSKA Moscow where Kostylev also became the club's manager.

At the 1994 European U-18 Championship Demchenko, playing for the Russia national team, became a top scorer of the tournament. At that tournament played such football personalities like Raúl, Fernando Morientes, Míchel Salgado, Lars Ricken, Francesco Totti and others. Following the European championship Ajax offered $1 million Moscow team for the 17-year-old Demchenko and both player and club agreed. At Ajax, Demchenko mostly sat on the bench and had limited amount of playing experience. Following end of contract with the Dutch club, he returned to Zaporizhia where he joined FC Metalurh Zaporizhia.

Honours

Player
Ajax
 Intercontinental Cup: 1995
 UEFA Super Cup: 1995

References

External links
Demchenko at Ajax Amsterdam
Derkach, S. ''Andrei Demchenko: I have nothing to regret (Андрей Демченко: "Я ни о чем не жалею"). Passport (Zaporozhye). 15 September 2011.
 

Living people
1976 births
Ukrainian emigrants to Russia
Russian emigrants to Ukraine
Russian footballers
Russia youth international footballers
Russia under-21 international footballers
Ukrainian footballers
Soviet footballers
Footballers from Zaporizhzhia
Association football midfielders
FC Obolon-Brovar Kyiv players
PFC CSKA Moscow players
AFC Ajax players
FC Metalurh Zaporizhzhia players
FC Metalurh-2 Zaporizhzhia players
SSSOR Metalurh Zaporizhzhia players
FC Mariupol players
FC Helios Kharkiv players
FC Dacia Chișinău players
Russian Premier League players
Eredivisie players
Ukrainian Premier League players
Ukrainian First League players
Ukrainian Second League players
Ukrainian football managers
NK Veres Rivne managers
FC Lviv managers
FC Metalist 1925 Kharkiv managers
FC Dila Gori managers
Russian expatriate footballers
Expatriate footballers in Ukraine
Russian expatriate sportspeople in Ukraine
Ukrainian expatriate footballers
Ukrainian expatriate football managers
Ukrainian expatriate sportspeople in the Netherlands
Expatriate footballers in the Netherlands
Ukrainian expatriate sportspeople in Moldova
Expatriate footballers in Moldova
Ukrainian expatriate sportspeople in Georgia (country)
Expatriate football managers in Georgia (country)